Olukpınar can refer to:

 Olukpınar, Kemah
 Olukpınar, İscehisar
 Olukpınar, Polatlı